The California Republic, or Bear Flag Republic, was an unrecognized breakaway state from Mexico, that for 25 days in 1846 militarily controlled an area north of San Francisco, in and around what is now Sonoma County in California.

In June 1846, thirty-three American immigrants in Alta California who had entered without official permission rebelled against the Mexican department's government. Among their grievances were that they had not been allowed to buy or rent land and had been threatened with expulsion. Mexican officials had been concerned about a coming war with the United States and the growing influx of Americans into California. The rebellion was covertly encouraged by U.S. Army Brevet Captain John C. Frémont, and added to the troubles of the recent outbreak of the Mexican–American War.

The name "California Republic" appeared only on the flag the insurgents raised in Sonoma. It indicated their aspiration of forming a republican government under their control. The rebels elected military officers but no civil structure was ever established. Their flag, featuring a silhouette of a California grizzly bear, became known as the Bear Flag and was later the basis for the official state flag of California.

Three weeks later, on July 5, 1846, the Republic's military of 100 to 200 men was subsumed into the California Battalion commanded by Brevet Captain John C. Frémont. The Bear Flag Revolt and whatever remained of the "California Republic" ceased to exist on July 9 when U.S. Navy Lieutenant Joseph Revere raised the United States flag in front of the Sonoma Barracks and sent a second flag to be raised at Sutter's Fort.

Background of the Bear Flag Revolt

Alta California's Governance

By 1845–46, Alta California had been largely neglected by Mexico for the twenty-five years since Mexican independence. It had evolved into a semi-autonomous region with open discussions among Californios about whether California should remain with Mexico; seek independence; or become annexed to the United Kingdom, France, or the United States. In 1845, the widely hated Manuel Micheltorena, the latest governor to be sent by Mexico, was forcefully ejected by the Californians. His forces were defeated at the Battle of Providencia (also known as the Second Battle of Cahuenga Pass) as a result of the actions of California pioneer John Marsh. This resulted in the return of Californian Pio Pico to the governorship. Pico ruled the region south of San Luis Obispo with his capital in The Town of Our Lady the Queen of Angels of the Porciúncula River, now known as Los Angeles. The area to the north of the pueblo of San Luis Obispo was under the control of Alta California's Commandante José Castro with headquarters near Monterey, the traditional capital and, significantly, the location of the Customhouse. Pico and Castro disliked each other personally and soon began escalating disputes over control of the Customhouse income.

Decrees issued by the central government in Mexico City were often acknowledged and supported with proclamations but ignored in practice. By the end of 1845, when rumors of a military force being sent from Mexico proved to be false, rulings by the other district government were mostly ignored.

Texas, immigration and land

The relationship between the United States and Mexico had been deteriorating for some time. The Republic of Texas, which Mexico still considered to be its territory, had been admitted to statehood in 1845. Mexico had earlier threatened war if this happened. James K. Polk was elected President of the United States in 1844, and considered his election a mandate for his expansionist policies.

Mexican law had long allowed grants of land to naturalized Mexican citizens. Obtaining Mexican citizenship was not difficult and many earlier American immigrants had gone through the process and obtained free grants of land. That same year (1845) anticipation of war with the United States and the increasing number of immigrants reportedly coming from the United States resulted in orders from Mexico City denying immigrants from the United States entry into California. The orders also required California's officials not to allow land grants, sales or even rental of land to non-citizen emigrants already in California. All non-citizen immigrants, who had arrived without permission, were threatened with being forced out of California.

Alta California's Sub-Prefect Francisco Guerrero had written to U.S. Consul Thomas O. Larkin that:

During November 1845, California's Commandante General José Castro met with representatives of the 1845 American immigrants at Sonoma and Sutter's Fort. In his decree dated November 6 he wrote: "Therefore conciliating my duty [to enforce the orders from Mexico] with of the sentiment of hospitality which distinguishes the Mexicans, and considering that most of said expedition is composed of families and industrious people, I have deemed it best to permit them, provisionally, to remain in the department" with the conditions that they obey all laws, apply within three months for a license to settle, and promise to depart if that license was not granted.

Captain Frémont in California

A 62-man exploring and mapping expedition entered California in late 1845 under the command of U.S. Army Brevet Captain John C. Frémont. Frémont was well known in the United States as an author and explorer. He was also the son-in-law of expansionist U.S. Senator Thomas Hart Benton. Early in 1846 Frémont acted provocatively with California's Commandante General José Castro near the pueblo of Monterey and then moved his group out of California into Oregon Country. He was followed into Oregon by U.S. Marine Lt Archibald H. Gillespie who had been sent from Washington with a secret message to U.S. Consul Thomas O. Larkin and instructions to share the message with Frémont. Gillespie also brought a packet of letters from Frémont's wife and father-in-law.

Frémont's thoughts (as related in his book, written forty years later) after reading the message and letters were: "I saw the way opening clear before me. War with Mexico was inevitable; and a grand opportunity presented itself to realize in their fullest extent the far-sighted views of Senator Benton. I resolved to move forward on the opportunity and return forthwith to the Sacramento valley in order to bring to bear all the influence I could command." Nevertheless, Frémont needed to be circumspect. As a military officer he could face court-martial for violating the Neutrality Act of 1794 that made it illegal for an American to wage war against another country at peace with the United States. The next morning Gillespie and Frémont's group departed for California. Frémont returned to the Sacramento Valley and set up camp near Sutter Buttes.

USS Portsmouth in the San Francisco Bay

U.S. Consul Thomas O. Larkin, concerned about the increasing possibility of war, sent a request to Commodore John D. Sloat of U.S. Navy's Pacific Squadron, for a warship to protect U.S. citizens and interests in Alta California. In response, the  arrived at Monterey on April 22, 1846. After receiving information about Frémont's returning to California, Consul Larkin and Portsmouth's captain John Berrien Montgomery decided the ship should move into the San Francisco Bay. She sailed from Monterey on June 1.

Lt. Gillespie, having returned from the Oregon Country and his meeting with Frémont on June 7, found Portsmouth moored at Sausalito. He carried a request for money, materiel and supplies for Frémont's group. The requested resupplies were taken by the ship's launch up the Sacramento River to a location near Frémont's camp.

Bear Flag Revolt

Settlers meet with Frémont
William B. Ide, a future leader of the Revolt, writes of receiving an unsigned written message on June 8, 1846: "Notice is hereby given, that a large body of armed Spaniards on horseback, amounting to 250 men, have been seen on their way to the Sacramento Valley, destroying crops and burning houses, and driving off the cattle. Capt. Fremont invites every freeman in the valley to come to his camp at the Butts [sic], immediately; and he hopes to stay the enemy and put a stop to his" – (Here the sheet was folded and worn in-two, and no more is found). Ide and other settlers quickly traveled to Frémont's camp but were generally dissatisfied by the lack of a specific plan and their inability to obtain from Frémont any definite promise of aid.

Taking of government horses
Some of the group who had been meeting with Frémont departed from his camp and, on June 10, 1846, captured a herd of 170 Mexican government-owned horses being moved by Californio soldiers from San Rafael and Sonoma to the Californian Commandante General, José Castro, in Santa Clara. It had been reported amongst the emigrants that the officer in charge of the herd had made statements threatening that the horses would be used by Castro to drive the foreigners out of California. The captured horses were taken to Frémont's new camp at the junction of the Feather and Bear rivers.

These men next determined to seize the pueblo of Sonoma to deny the Californios a rallying point north of San Francisco Bay. Capturing both the arms and military materiel stored in the unmanned Presidio of Sonoma and Mexican Lieutenant Colonel Mariano Guadalupe Vallejo would delay any military response from the Californios. The insurgent group was nominally led by Ezekiel "Stuttering Zeke" Merritt, whom Frémont described as his "field-lieutenant" and lauded for not questioning him.

Capture of Sonoma

Historian George Tays has cautioned "The description of the men, their actions just prior and subsequent to the taking of Sonoma, are as varied as the number of authors. No two accounts agree, and it is impossible to determine the truth of their statements." Historian H. H. Bancroft has written that Frémont "instigated and planned" the horse raid, and incited the American settlers indirectly and "guardedly" to revolt.

Before dawn on Sunday, June 14, 1846, over 30 American insurgents arrived at the pueblo of Sonoma. They had traveled overnight from Napa Valley. A majority of their number had started a couple of days earlier from Fremont's camp in the Sacramento valley but others had joined the group along the way. Meeting no resistance, they approached Comandante Vallejo's home and pounded on his door. After a few minutes Vallejo opened the door dressed in his Mexican Army uniform. Communication was not good until American Jacob P. Leese (Vallejo's brother-in-law) was summoned to translate.

Vallejo then invited the filibusters' leaders into his home to negotiate terms. Two other Californio officers and Leese joined the negotiations. The insurgents waiting outside sent elected "captains" John Grigsby and William Ide inside to speed the proceedings. The effect of Vallejo's hospitality in the form of wine and brandy for the negotiators and someone else's barrel of aguardiente for those outside is debatable. However, when the agreement was presented to those outside they refused to endorse it. Rather than releasing the Mexican officers under parole they insisted they be held as hostages. John Grigsby refused to remain as leader of the group, stating he had been deceived by Frémont. William Ide gave an impassioned speech urging the rebels to stay in Sonoma and start a new republic. Referring to the stolen horses Ide ended his oration with "Choose ye this day what you will be! We are robbers, or we must be conquerors!"

At that time, Vallejo and his three associates were placed on horseback and taken to Frémont accompanied by eight or nine of the insurgents who did not favor forming a new republic under the circumstances. That night they camped at the Vaca Rancho. Some young Californio vigilantes under Juan Padilla evaded the guards, aroused Vallejo and offered to help him escape. Vallejo declined, wanting to avoid any bloodshed and anticipating that Frémont would release him on parole.

The Sonoma Barracks became the headquarters for the remaining twenty-four rebels, who within a few days created their Bear Flag (see the "Bear Flag" section below). After the flag was raised Californios called the insurgents Los Osos (The Bears) and "Bear Flaggers" because of their flag and in derision of their often scruffy appearance. The rebels embraced the expression, and their uprising, which they originally called the Popular Movement, became known as the Bear Flag Revolt. Henry L. Ford was elected First Lieutenant of the company and obtained promises of obedience to orders. Samuel Kelsey was elected Second Lieutenant, Grandville P. Swift and Samuel Gibson Sergeants.

Ide's proclamation 

During the night of June 14–15, 1846 (below), William B. Ide wrote a proclamation announcing and explaining the reasons for the revolt. There were additional copies and some more moderate versions (produced in both English and Spanish) distributed around northern California through June 18.

Need for gunpowder
A major problem for the Bears in Sonoma was the lack of sufficient gunpowder to defend against the expected Mexican attack. William Todd was dispatched on Monday the fifteenth, with a letter to be delivered to the USS Portsmouth telling of the events in Sonoma and describing themselves as "fellow country men". Todd, having been instructed not to repeat any of the requests in the letter (refers to their need for gunpowder), disregarded that and voiced the request for gunpowder. Captain Montgomery, while sympathetic, declined because of his country's neutrality. Todd, José de Rosa (the messenger Vallejo sent to Montgomery), and U.S. Navy Lieutenant John S. Misroon returned to Sonoma in the Portsmouth's launch the morning of the 16th. Misroon's mission was, without interfering with the revolt, to prevent violence to noncombatants.

Todd was given a second assignment. He was sent to Bodega Bay with an unnamed companion (sometimes called 'the Englishman') to obtain powder from American settlers in that area. On June 18, Bears Thomas Cowie and George Fowler were sent to Rancho Sotoyome (near current-day Healdsburg, California) to pick up a cache of gunpowder from Moses Carson, brother of Frémont's scout Kit Carson.

Sutter's Fort

Frémont's "field-lieutenant" Merritt returned to Sacramento (known as New Helvetia at the time, so named by the Swiss John Sutter) on June 16 with his prisoners and recounted the events in Sonoma. Frémont either was fearful of going against the popular sentiment at Sonoma or saw the advantages of holding the Californio officers as hostages. He also decided to imprison Governor Vallejo's brother-in-law, the American Jacob Leese, in Sutter's Fort. Frémont recounts in his memoirs, "Affairs had now assumed a critical aspect and I presently saw that the time had come when it was unsafe to leave events to mature under unfriendly, or mistaken, direction … I knew the facts of the situation. These I could not make known, but felt warranted in assuming the responsibility and acting on my own knowledge."

Frémont's artist and cartographer on his third expedition, Edward Kern, was placed in command of Sutter's Fort and its company of dragoons by Frémont. That left John Sutter the assignment as lieutenant of the dragoons at $50 a month, and second in command of his own fort.

While in command there news of the stranded Donner Party reached Kern; Sutter's Fort had been their unreached destination. Kern vaguely promised the federal government would do something for a rescue party across the Sierra, but had no authority to pay anyone. He was later criticized for his mismanagement delaying the search.

Castro's response
Word of the taking of the government horses, the capture of Sonoma, and the imprisonment of the Mexican officers at Sutter's Fort soon reached Commandante General José Castro at his headquarters in Santa Clara. He issued two proclamations on June 17. The first asked the citizens of California to come to the aid of their country. The second promised protection for all foreigners not involved in the revolt. A group of 50–60 militia under command of Captain Joaquin de la Torre traveled up to San Pablo and, by boat, westward across the San Francisco Bay to Point San Quentin on the 23rd. Two additional divisions with a total of about 100 men arrived at San Pablo on June 27.

Battle of Olúmpali
On June 20 when the procurement parties failed to return as expected, Lieutenant Ford sent Sergeant Gibson with four men to Rancho Sotoyome. Gibson obtained the powder and on the way back fought with several Californians and captured one of them. From the prisoner they learned that Cowie and Fowler had died. There are Californio and Oso versions of what had happened. Ford also learned that William Todd and his companion had been captured by the Californio irregulars led by Juan Padilla and José Ramón Carrillo.

Ford writes, in his biography, that before leaving Sonoma to search for the other two captives and Padilla's men, he sent a note to Ezekiel Merritt in Sacramento asking him to gather volunteers to help defend Sonoma. Ide's version is that Ford wrote to Frémont saying that the Bears had lost confidence in Ide's leadership. In either case, Ford then rode toward Santa Rosa with seventeen to nineteen Bears. Not finding Padilla, the Bears headed toward one of his homes near Two Rock. The following morning the Bears captured three or four men near the Rancho Laguna de San Antonio and unexpectedly discovered what they assumed was Juan Padilla's group near the Indian rancho of Olúmpali. Ford approached the adobe but more men appeared and others came "pouring out of the adobe". Militiamen from south of the Bay, led by Mexican Captain Joaquin de la Torre, had joined with Padilla's irregulars and now numbered about seventy. Ford's men positioned themselves in a grove of trees and opened fire when the enemy charged on horseback, killing one Californio and wounding another. During the ensuing long-range battle, William Todd and his companion escaped from the house where they were being held and ran to the Bears. The Californios disengaged from the long-range fighting after suffering a few wounded and returned to San Rafael. A Californian militiaman reported that their muskets could not shoot as far as the rifles used by some Bears. This was the only battle fought during the Bear Flag Revolt.

The deaths of Cowie and Fowler, as well as the lethal battle, raised the anxiety of both the Californios, who left the area for safety, and the immigrants, who moved into Sonoma to be under the protection of the muskets and cannon that had been taken from the Sonoma Barracks. This increased the number in Sonoma to about two hundred. Some immigrant families were housed in the Barracks, others in the homes of the Californios.

Frémont arrives to defend Sonoma

Having learned of Ford's request for volunteers to defend Sonoma and hearing reports that General Castro was preparing an attack, Frémont left his camp near Sutter's Fort for Sonoma on June 23. With him were ninety men – his own party plus trappers and settlers under Samuel J. Hensley. Frémont would say in his memoirs that he wrote a letter of resignation from the Army and sent it to his father-in-law Thomas Hart Benton in case the government should wish to disavow his action. They arrived at Sonoma in the early morning of the 25th and by noon were on their way to San Rafael accompanied by a contingent of Bears under Ford's command. They arrived at the former San Rafael mission but the Californios had vanished. The rebels set up camp in the old mission and sent out scouting parties.

On Sunday the 28th a small boat was spotted coming across the bay. Kit Carson and some companions went to intercept it. It held twin brothers Francisco and Ramón de Haro, their uncle José de la Reyes Berreyesa, and an oarsman (probably one of the Castro brothers from San Pablo) – all unarmed. The Haro brothers and Berreyesa were dropped off at the shoreline and started on foot for the mission. All three were shot and killed. Beyond that almost every fact is disputed. Some say Frémont ordered the killings. Others, that they were carrying secret messages from Castro to Torre. Others that Carson committed the homicides as revenge for the deaths of Cowie and Fowler or they were shot by Frémont's Delaware Indians. This incident became an issue in Frémont's later campaign for President. Partisan eyewitnesses and newspapers related totally conflicting stories.

Captain de la Torre's ruse
Late the same afternoon as the killings, a scouting party intercepted a letter indicating that Torre intended to attack Sonoma the following morning. Frémont felt there was no choice but to return to defend Sonoma as quickly as possible. The garrison there had found a similar letter and had all weapons loaded and at the ready before dawn the next day when Frémont and Ford's forces approached Sonoma – almost provoking firing by the garrison. Frémont, understanding that he had been tricked, left again for San Rafael after a hasty breakfast. He arrived back at the old mission within twenty-four hours of leaving but during that period Torre and his men had time to escape to San Pablo via boat. Torre had successfully used the ruse not only to escape but almost succeeded in provoking a 'friendly fire' incident among the insurgents.

After reaching San Pablo, Torre reported that the combined rebel force was too strong to be attacked as planned. All three of Castro's divisions then returned to the old headquarters near Santa Clara where a council of war was held on June 30. It was decided that the current plan must be abandoned and any new approach would require the cooperation of Pio Pico and his southern forces. A messenger was sent to the Governor. Meanwhile, the army moved southwards to San Juan where General Castro was, on July 6, when he learned of the events in Monterey.

Actions in and around Yerba Buena
On July 1, Frémont and twelve men convinced Captain William Phelps to ferry them in the Moscow'''s launch to the old Spanish fort at the entrance to the Golden Gate. They landed without resistance and spiked the ten old, abandoned cannon. The next day Robert B. Semple led ten Bears in the launch to the pueblo of Yerba Buena (the future San Francisco) to arrest the naturalized Englishman Robert Ridley who was captain of the port. Ridley was sent to Sutter's Fort to be locked up with other prisoners.

Independence Day, 1846, in Sonoma

A great celebration was held on the Fourth of July beginning with readings of the United States Declaration of Independence in Sonoma's plaza. There were also cannon salutes, the roasting of whole beeves, and the consumption of many foods and all manner of beverages. Frémont and the contingent from San Rafael arrived in time for the fandango held in Salvador Vallejo's big adobe on the corner of the town square.

Formation of the California Battalion

On July 5, Frémont called a public meeting and proposed to the Bears that they unite with his party and form a single military unit. He said that he would accept command if they would pledge obedience, proceed honorably, and not violate the chastity of women. A compact was drawn up which all volunteers of the California Battalion signed or made their marks. A majority of those present also agreed to officially date the era of independence not from the taking of Sonoma but from July 5 to allow Frémont to "begin at the beginning".

The next day Frémont, leaving the fifty men of Company B at the Barracks to defend Sonoma, left with the rest of the Battalion for Sutter's Fort. They took with them two of the captured Mexican field pieces, as well as muskets, a supply of ammunition, blankets, horses, and cattle. The seven-ton Mermaid was used for transporting the cannon, arms, ammunition and saddles from Napa to Sutter's Fort.

U.S. Navy and U.S. Marine Corps capture Monterey
The war against Mexico had already been declared by the United States Congress on May 13, 1846. Because of the slow cross-continent communication of the time, no one in California knew that conclusively. (Official notice of the war finally reached California on August 12, 1846.) Commodore John D. Sloat, commanding the U.S. Navy's Pacific Squadron, had been waiting in Monterey Bay since July 1 or 2 to obtain convincing proof of war. Sloat was 65 years old and had requested to be relieved from his command the previous May. He was also acutely aware of the 1842 Capture of Monterey, when his predecessor, Commodore Thomas ap Catesby Jones, thought war had been declared and captured the capital of Alta California, only to discover his error and abandon it the next day. This resulted in diplomatic problems, and Jones was removed as commander of the Pacific Squadron.

Sloat had learned of Frémont's confrontation with the Californios on Gavilan Peak and of his support for the Bears in Sonoma. He was also aware of Lt. Gillespie's tracking down of Frémont with letters and orders. Sloat finally concluded on July 6 that he needed to act, saying to U.S. Consul Larkin, "I shall be blamed for doing too little or too much – I prefer the latter." Early July 7, the frigate USS Savannah and the two sloops, USS Cyane and USS Levant of the United States Navy, captured Monterey, California, and raised the flag of the United States. Sloat had his proclamation read in and posted in English and Spanish: "...henceforth California will be a portion of the United States".

Conclusion and aftermath

Two days later, July 9, the Bear Flag Revolt and whatever remained of the "California Republic" ended when Navy Lieutenant Joseph Revere was sent to Sonoma from the USS Portsmouth, which had been berthed at Sausalito, carrying two 27-star United States flags, one for Sonoma and the other for Sutter's Fort (the squadron had run out of new 28-star flags that reflected Texas' admittance to the Union). The Bear Flag that was taken down that day was given to the Clerk of the Portsmouth, John Elliott Montgomery, the son of Commander John B. Montgomery. John E. wrote to his mother later in July that "Cuffy came down growling". The following November, John and his older brother disappeared while traveling to Sacramento and were presumed deceased. Commander Montgomery kept the Bear Flag, had a copy made, and eventually both were delivered to the Secretary of the Navy. In 1855 the Secretary sent both flags to the Senators from California who donated them to the Society of Pioneers in San Francisco. The original Bear Flag was destroyed in the fires following the 1906 San Francisco earthquake. A replica, created in 1896 for the 50th Anniversary celebrations, is on display at the Sonoma Barracks.

Bear Flag

The most notable legacy of the "California Republic" was the adoption of its flag as the basis of the modern state Flag of California. The flag has a star, a grizzly bear, and a red stripe with the words "California Republic". The Bear Flag Monument on the Sonoma Plaza, site of the raising of the original Bear Flag, is marked by a California Historical Landmark #7.

The design and creation of the original Bear Flag used in the Bear Flag Revolt is often credited to Peter Storm.[Flags of the World, "Storm Bear Flag, California"] The flags were made about one week before the storming of Sonoma, when William Todd and his companions claim to have made theirs, apparently based on Mr. Storm's first flags.

In 1878, at the request of the Los Angeles Evening Express, William L. Todd (1818–1879) wrote an account of the Bear Flag used at the storming of Sonoma, perhaps the first to be raised. Soon after, his implementation became the basis for the first official State flag. Todd acknowledged the contributions of other Osos to the flag, including Granville P. Swift, Peter Storm, and Henry L. Ford in an 1878 newspaper article. Todd painted the flag on domestic cotton cloth, roughly a yard and a half in length. It featured a red star based on the California Lone Star Flag that was flown during California's 1836 revolt led by Juan Alvarado and Isaac Graham. The flag also featured an image of a grizzly bear statant (standing), as opposed to the original flag, which showed it salient (leaping) or rampant (rearing up). The modern flag shows the bear passant (walking).

Timeline of events

See also

 Vermont Republic
 Republic of Lower California/Republic of Sonora, Mexico
 Rough and Ready, California
 Republic of Texas
 State of Deseret
 Kingdom of Hawaii / Republic of Hawaii
 Green Mountain Boys
 Army of the Republic of Texas
 Texian Army
 Texas Navy
 Nauvoo Legion
 California National Guard
 New California Republic
 Benjamin Dewell, member of the Bear Flag Rebellion

 Notes 

References

Citations 
   Also at History of California, VOL. V. 1846–1848
 
 
 
 
 
 
 
 
 
 
 
 
 
 

External links
 "The Bear Flag Revolt' (U.S. National Park Service)
 John Bidwell, "Frémont in the Conquest of California", The Century Illustrated Monthly Magazine'', vol. XLI, no. 4, February 1891
 The Bear Flag Museum
 Modern representation of the flag as designed by William Todd.

Rebellions in North America
California
Former territorial entities in North America
Former regions and territories of the United States
Former republics
Former unrecognized countries
History of Sonoma County, California
People of the Bear Flag Revolt
Pre-statehood history of California
1846 establishments in Alta California
States and territories established in 1846
1846 disestablishments in Alta California
States and territories disestablished in 1846
Symbols of California
Separatism in Mexico
United States history timelines
History of the Southwestern United States